The 1994–95 New York Islanders season was the 23rd season in the franchise's history. The Islanders were unable to qualify for the playoffs, thus ending their two season playoff streak.

Offseason

Regular season
After starting the season with a 4–2–1 record, the Islanders fell into a slump from which they could not recover. They would win only 11 of their remaining 41 games, going 11–26–4. The Islanders would finish 12 points out of eighth place and miss the playoffs for the first time since 1992.

Near the end of the season, General Manager Don Maloney decided that the core of players he had left alone for three seasons should be totally revamped, and he undertook a rebuilding project. He traded Pierre Turgeon and Vladimir Malakhov to Montreal for Kirk Muller and Mathieu Schneider, and Benoit Hogue was sent to Toronto for young goaltender Eric Fichaud. Additionally, Maloney allowed the team's leading scorer, Ray Ferraro, to depart as an unrestricted free agent at the conclusion of the season. Fans' displeasure at the GM for trading the popular Turgeon was magnified when Muller balked at joining a rebuilding team. He only played 45 games for the Islanders before being sent to the Maple Leafs.

The Islanders finished the regular season having allowed the most short-handed goals in the NHL, with 11.

Season standings

Schedule and results

Player statistics

Forwards
Note: GP= Games played; G= Goals; A= Assists; Pts = Points; PIM = Penalties in minutes
Source:

Defensemen
Note: GP= Games played; G= Goals; A= Assists; Pts = Points; PIM = Penalties in minutes

Goaltending
Note: GP= Games played; W= Wins; L= Losses; T = Ties; SO = Shutouts; GAA = Goals Against Average

Draft picks
Source:

References
Islanders on Hockey Database

New York Islanders seasons
New York Islanders
New York Islanders
New York Islanders
New York Islanders